Yonhap News TV, stylised as YONHAP NEWS TV, is a South Korean pay television network and broadcasting company, owned by the Yonhap News Agency-led consortium. It began broadcasting on 1 December 2011.
Yonhap News TV started broadcasting with four new South Korean nationwide generalist cable TV networks. Thoese are JoongAng Ilbo's JTBC, Dong-A Ilbo's Channel A, Chosun Ilbo's TV Chosun, and Maeil Kyungje's MBN in 2011. The four new networks supplement existing conventional free-to-air TV networks like KBS, MBC, SBS, and other smaller channels launched following deregulation in 1990.

History 
 22 July 2009 - Amendment of Media law passed the South Korean national assembly to deregulate the media market of South Korea.
 31 December 2010 - JTBC, TV Chosun, MBN, and Channel A elected as a General Cable Television Channel Broadcasters and Yonhap News TV elected as an All-News Cable Channel Broadcaster.
 1 December 2011 – Yonhap News TV begins broadcasting.

See also 
 Yonhap News Agency

References

External links 
  

Broadcasting companies of South Korea
Television channels in South Korea
Television channels and stations established in 2011